Benno Sterzenbach (born 3 March 1916 Osnabrück - died 13 September 1985 Feldafing) was a German cinema and theatre actor and director.

Biography

His first major role on stage was Götz von Berlichingen at which he played next to Ellen Schwiers as Adelheid at the Jagsthausen festival. On television, he is mostly known for his roles in filmed theatrical adaptations: Der Richter und sein Henker (1957) by Friedrich Dürrenmatt, Der Schlaf der Gerechten (1962) by Albrecht Goes and Mirandolina (1963) by Carlo Goldoni.

Suspected of espionage due to his editorial relations, he was arrested by the Gestapo in 1941, and imprisoned for a month, during which time he protested his innocence. He was eventually freed after his case was expedited. This episode was repeated in a number of his plays.

With Paths in Twilight in 1948, he made his cinematic debut under the direction of Gustav Fröhlich. In 1960, he was in one of the first films by Edgar Wallace after the war: Der Rächer. In the same year, he was in Es ist soweit. In 1966, he acted alongside Heinz Reincke in one of the first German colour television series, Adrian der Tulpendieb.

Benno Sterzenbach found most success in the role of General Winston Woodrov Wamsler in Raumpatrouille – Die phantastischen Abenteuer des Raumschiffes Orion.

In France, he is best known for his role as Major Achbach in La Grande Vadrouille with Louis de Funès and Bourvil.

Benno Sterzenbach also wrote a number of books.

Filmography 

1948: Paths in Twilight - Stefan Kolb
1951: My Friend the Thief
1955: Operation Sleeping Bag - Offizier des SS
1955: The Cornet - Rittmeister Reningen
1959: Freddy unter fremden Sternen - Miller
1960: The Time Has Come (TV miniseries) - Lomax
1960: Der Rächer - Sir Gregory Penn
1962: Max the Pickpocket - Charly Gibbons
1964:  (TV film) - Dr. Frank Baird
1965: Doktor Murkes gesammelte Nachrufe (TV film) - Grosshack
1966: Adrian der Tulpendieb (TV miniseries) - Kapitän Josias
1966: Raumpatrouille – Die phantastischen Abenteuer des Raumschiffes Orion (TV miniseries) - General Wamsler
1966: La Grande Vadrouille (Die große Sause) - Major Achbach
1970: Pippi on the Run - Policeman
1982: L'As des as - Major Aschbach - Gestapo officer
1982: Unterwegs nach Atlantis (TV series) - Doctor Graf
1983: Hostage - Mr. Maresch
2003: Raumpatrouille Orion – Rücksturz ins Kino - General Winston Woodrow Wamsler (archive footage)

External links

1916 births
1985 deaths
People from Osnabrück
German male film actors
German male stage actors
German male television actors
20th-century German male actors